Cuapetes lacertae, previously known as Periclimenes lacertae, is a species of shrimp belonging to the family Palaemonidae. Its name is due to the fact the first specimen was collected from Lizard Island: lacerta being Latin for "lizard".

Description
Medium-sized shrimp, slender, subcylindrical body form.

Distribution
This species is known from Lizard Island, Queensland. Individuals can be found living among the tentacles of the polyps of the mushroom coral Heliofungia actiniformis.

References

Palaemonoidea
Crustaceans of Australia
Marine fauna of Oceania
Crustaceans described in 1992